Homoeosoma gravosellum is a species of snout moth in the genus Homoeosoma. It was described by Roesler in 1965, and is known from Croatia and Romania.

References

Moths described in 1965
Phycitini
Moths of Europe